Uvarus livens, is a species of predaceous diving beetle found in India, Andaman & Nicobar Islands, Bangladesh, Sri Lanka, and Malaysia.

References 

Dytiscidae
Insects of Sri Lanka
Insects described in 1892